Zinziswa Ursula "Zinzi" Rabe is a South African politician who has represented the African National Congress (ANC) in the Eastern Cape Provincial Legislature since 2019. She was elected to her legislative seat in the 2019 general election, ranked 34th on the ANC's provincial party list. In 2022, ahead of the ANC's 55th National Conference, the ANC Youth League endorsed Rabe as a candidate for election to the party's National Executive Committee.

References

External links 

 
 "ANC MPL may head to court to challenge ‘irregular’ branch meeting" at the Daily Dispatch
 "New Eastern Cape health MEC must step up to 'historic challenges'" at the Herald

African National Congress politicians
Living people
Year of birth missing (living people)
Members of the Eastern Cape Provincial Legislature
21st-century South African politicians